The following is a list of centenarians – specifically, people who became famous as musicians/singers, composers and music patrons – known for reasons other than their longevity. For more lists, see: Lists of centenarians.

References

Musicians, composers and music patrons